Ryan Corr (born 15 January 1989) is an Australian actor. Corr is known for his roles in the Australian drama series Packed to the Rafters and Love Child along with film roles in Wolf Creek 2 (2013), The Water Diviner (2014) and Holding the Man (2015).

Early life 
Corr was born in Melbourne. His father is Peter Corr, the head coach of the Australian women's goalball team.

In 2009, he graduated from the National Institute of Dramatic Art (NIDA).

Career 
He began making appearances in film and television from the age of five, but started his acting career in earnest at age thirteen with the film Opraholic. His first television performance was on The Sleepover Club with a supporting role as Matthew McDougal. Following this, he landed a lead role as Sheng Zamett on Silversun (2004).

Soon after, Corr had guest appearances on shows such as Scooter: Secret Agent, Blue Heelers, and Neighbours. As a voice actor, he voiced a sheep in Charlotte's Web. In 2006, the second series of Blue Water High aired on Australian TV in which Corr starred as young surfer Eric, one of the six chosen teens to attend Solar Blue. In 2010, Corr appeared in the final few episodes of Underbelly: The Golden Mile as Michael Kanaan and was a regular character on the popular Australian television show Packed to the Rafters, playing Dave Rafter's nephew Coby Jennings.

In 2013, he appeared in the teen thriller film 6 Plots, and starred alongside John Jarratt in Wolf Creek 2, the 2013 sequel to the horror film Wolf Creek.

In 2015, Corr starred in Neil Armfield's romantic-drama film Holding the Man, adapted from Timothy Conigrave's 1995 memoir of the same name. He portrayed Conigrave opposite Craig Stott who portrayed Conigrave's partner, John Caleo.

In 2016, he starred in the television series Wanted.

Corr appeared as Joseph in Helen Edmundson's 2018 film Mary Magdalene.

In 2022, he had a recurring role in HBO's House of the Dragon as Ser Harwin Strong.

Legal issues 
In May 2014, Corr was charged with heroin possession after being found with a freezer bag holding 0.26g (less than 1/100 of an ounce) of the drug in the Sydney suburb of Bondi. After admitting to the possession, the actor was given a 12-month good behaviour bond with no conviction recorded.

The arrest took place a few days after Corr's grandfather went into a coma following a heart attack. He had been close with his grandfather, who had flown with him to acting jobs when he was a child. According to Corr's lawyer, Corr was grateful for the arrest, because it stopped him from using heroin for the first time. Corr later stated, "I found myself in a position where I was incredibly upset, someone offered me something and 200 metres after, I was picked up with it. It was an error of judgment."

Filmography

References

External links

 
 
 
 Official Silversun website
 Official Blue Water High website

1989 births
Male actors from Melbourne
Australian male child actors
Australian male film actors
Australian male television actors
Australian male voice actors
Australian people of Irish descent
Living people
National Institute of Dramatic Art alumni
21st-century Australian male actors